Banester is a surname. Notable people with the surname include:

 Gilbert Banester ( 1445–1487), English composer and poet
 John Bannister (disambiguation), multiple people
 Thomas Banester (by 1529–1571), English politician